Old Las Vegas Mormon Fort State Historic Park is a state park of Nevada, containing the Old Mormon Fort, the first structure built by people of European heritage in what would become Las Vegas fifty years later. In present-day Las Vegas, the site is at the southeast corner of Las Vegas Boulevard and Washington Avenue, less than one mile north of the downtown area and Fremont Street. This is the only U.S. state park located in a city that houses the first building ever built in that city. The fort was listed on the National Register of Historic Places on February 1, 1972. The site is memorialized with a tablet erected by the Church of Jesus Christ of Latter-day Saints in 1997, along with Nevada Historical Marker #35, and two markers placed by the Daughters of Utah Pioneers.

History

Mormon period
Mormon missionaries led by William Bringhurst arrived on June 14, 1855, and selected a site, along one of the creeks that flowed from the Las Vegas Springs, on which they would build the fort. The fort served as the midpoint on the trail between Salt Lake City, Utah and Los Angeles, California.

While called a fort, it was never home to any military troops but like many Mormon forts provided a defense for the local settlers against an Indian attack. As a result of the beginning of the Utah War, the Mormons abandoned the fort.

Civil War period
Around 1860, a small detachment of U.S. Army troops was assigned to protect the settlers at the fort.

The fort was called Fort Baker during the Civil War, named after Edward Dickinson Baker. In a letter from Col. James Henry Carleton written to Pacific Department headquarters, December 23, 1861, Carleton mentions his plan to send an advance party of seven companies from Fort Yuma to reoccupy Fort Mojave and reestablish the ferry there. Carleton then intended to send on from there three cavalry companies and one of infantry to the Mormon fort at Las Vegas, and establish a post called Fort Baker. This was in preparation for an advance to Salt Lake City the following year. The move to reoccupy Fort Mojave never occurred as planned because Carleton's California Column at Fort Yuma were sent instead into Arizona and New Mexico to evict the Confederates there the next year. However, Fort Mojave was later reoccupied in 1863 by Union troops from California. In 1864, a road survey party led by Captain Price, Company M, 2nd California Cavalry Regiment traveled on the route from Fort Douglas to Fort Mojave passing through Las Vegas, stopping for water there on June 10. No mention is made of any garrison there. Presumably the post was never garrisoned during the Civil War.

Ranching/early Las Vegas period
In 1865, Octavius Gass re-occupied the fort and started the irrigation works, renaming the area to Los Vegas Rancho (later renamed Las Vegas in 1902). Gass defaulted on a loan to Archibald Stewart in 1881 and lost the ranch, with Stewart and his wife Helen becoming the new caretakers. In 1902, William A. Clark's San Pedro, Los Angeles, and Salt Lake Railroad acquired the property from Helen Stewart along with most of what is now downtown Las Vegas, transferring most of the company's land to the now defunct Las Vegas Land and Water Company.

Site preservation
Ownership of the fort and the land around it changed hands many times and it had several close calls with destruction. In 1955, the land was acquired by the Las Vegas Elks. With support of the Daughters of Utah Pioneers, the city of Las Vegas acquired the fort in 1989. Long-term protection was gained when the state acquired the site as a state park in 1991.

A $4.5 million renovation and visitor center, designed by assemblageSTUDIO, was completed in 2005. A visitor center explains the history of the fort.

See also
Mormon Station State Historic Park
Las Vegas Mission
Fort Supply - another Mormon fort with a similar purpose
List of the oldest buildings in Nevada

References

External links 

Old Las Vegas Mormon State Historic Park
The Old Mormon Fort: Birthplace of Las Vegas, Nevada National Park Service Teaching with Historic Places Lesson Plan

State parks of Nevada
Forts in Nevada
Museums in Las Vegas
Military and war museums in Nevada
Downtown Las Vegas
Formerly Used Defense Sites in Nevada
History of Las Vegas
The Church of Jesus Christ of Latter-day Saints in Nevada
1855 establishments in New Mexico Territory
American Civil War on the National Register of Historic Places
Forts on the National Register of Historic Places in Nevada
National Register of Historic Places in Las Vegas
Nevada State Register of Historic Places
Pre-statehood history of Nevada
Protected areas established in 1991
1991 establishments in Nevada